"I Wanna Take Care of You" is a song co-written and recorded by American country music artist Billy Dean. It was released in March 1993 as the second single from Dean's album Fire in the Dark. The song reached number 22 on the Billboard Hot Country Singles & Tracks chart and number 9 on the Canadian RPM Country Tracks. It was written by Dean and J.K. Jones.

Chart performance

Year-end charts

References

1993 singles
1993 songs
Billy Dean songs
Song recordings produced by Jimmy Bowen
Liberty Records singles
Songs written by Billy Dean